A number of ships have been named Protector:

  was a 26-gun sixth-rate of the Massachusetts Navy launched in 1779 at Newburyport, Massachusetts, that  and  captured on 5 May 1781; the British Royal Navy renamed her HMS Hussar, and sold her in 1783.
Protector was a ship of 580 tons (bm) launched in 1751 for the British East India Company as a fast heavily armed warship to deter pirates and the French Company in Indian waters. In 1761 a monsoon wrecked her while she rode at anchor in Pondicherry Roads.
Protector (1826 ship) was a ship of 511 tons (bm) launched in 1826 at Chepstow. Between 1826 and 1831 she made two voyages to India for the British East India Company. She was lost in 1838 near Calcutta.
 was a barque of 380 tons (bm) launched at Lincoln, New Brunswick, Canada, in 1827 that in 1830 transported colonists to the nascent Swan River Colony.

See also
 HMAS Protector, more than one ship of the Royal Australian Navy
, more than one ship of the Royal Navy
, more than one ship of the U.S. Navy
 Protector (fireboat), commissioned in 2016 in Long Beach, California, U.S.
 Protector (fireboat, British Columbia), in Victoria, Canada
 Protector class (disambiguation), including Protecteur

Citations and references
Citations

References
Hackman, Rowan (2001) Ships of the East India Company. (Gravesend, Kent: World Ship Society). 

Ship names